Mniszków  is a village in Opoczno County, Łódź Voivodeship, in central Poland. It is the seat of the gmina (administrative district) called Gmina Mniszków.

The village has a population of 525.

References

Villages in Opoczno County
Radom Governorate
Kielce Voivodeship (1919–1939)
Łódź Voivodeship (1919–1939)